The Best American Short Stories 2006, a volume in The Best American Short Stories series, was edited by Katrina Kenison and by guest editor Ann Patchett.  This edition is notable in that it was the last edition edited by Katrina Kenison, who was succeeded by Heidi Pitlor the following year. Also, Patchett chose to present the stories in reverse-alphabetical order.

Stories included (in order of table of contents)

Other notable stories

Included in the "100 Other Distinguished Stories of 2006" were stories by noted authors like John Updike, Uwem Akpan, Alice Hoffman, Lorrie Moore, Joyce Carol Oates, Jeffrey Eugenides, Donald Barthelme, Chris Adrian and Judy Budnitz.

Notes

2006 anthologies
Fiction anthologies
Short Stories 2006
Houghton Mifflin books